En passant ("in passing") is a special method of capturing in chess that occurs when a pawn captures a horizontally adjacent enemy pawn that has just made an initial two-square advance. The capturing pawn moves to the square that the enemy pawn passed over, as if the enemy pawn had advanced only one square. The rule ensures that a pawn cannot use its two-square move to safely skip past an enemy pawn.

Capturing en passant is permitted only on the turn immediately after the two-square advance; it cannot be done on a later turn. The capturing move is sometimes notated by appending the abbreviation e.p.

Rules

The conditions for a pawn to capture an enemy pawn en passant are as follows:

 the enemy pawn advanced two squares on the previous move;
 the capturing pawn attacks the square that the enemy pawn passed over. 
If these conditions are met, the capturing pawn can move diagonally forward to the square that the enemy pawn passed, capturing the enemy pawn as if it had moved only one square. If the right to capture en passant is not exercised immediately, it is subsequently lost. Making the capture is optional, unless there is no other legal move.  

Only pawns may capture or be captured en passant; other pieces with the ability to capture diagonally—the king, queen, and bishop—cannot perform the capture. The en passant capture is the only capturing move in chess where the capturing piece moves to a square not occupied by the captured piece.

Notation
In algebraic notation, an en passant capture is notated using the capturing pawn's destination (not the captured pawn's location). In both algebraic and descriptive notation, the move may optionally be denoted by appending "e.p." or similar. For example, in algebraic notation, bxa3 or bxa3 e.p. may be used to represent a black pawn on b4 capturing a white pawn on a4 en passant.

Examples

Some chess openings feature the en passant capture. In the following line from Petrov's Defence, White captures the pawn on d5 en passant on move 6:

1. e4 e5
2. Nf3 Nf6
3. d4 exd4
4. e5 Ne4
5. Qxd4 d5 (see diagram)
6. exd6 e.p.

An en passant capture can occur as early as move 3. For example, in the French Defence after 1. e4 e6 2. e5, if Black responds with 2... d5, White can play 3. exd6 e.p. (diagram). This occurred in the game Steinitz–Fleissig, Vienna 1882.

In the diagram, the move 1... g5+ may seem to checkmate White, but it is in fact a blunder: White can counter this check with the en passant capture 2. fxg6 e.p., which cross-checks and checkmates Black. (Black can draw in the diagrammed position by playing 1...Qxf2+.)

In a game between Gunnar Gundersen and Albert H. Faul, Black played 12...f7-f5. White could have captured the black f-pawn en passant with his e-pawn, but he instead played:
13. h5+ Kh6 14. Nxe6+ 
The bishop on c1 effects a discovered check. 14...Kh7 results in 15.Qxg7#.
14... g5 15. hxg6 e.p.#
The en passant capture places Black in double check and checkmate (in fact, White's bishop is not necessary for the mate). An en passant capture is the only way a double check can be delivered without one of the checking pieces moving, as in this case.

The largest known number of en passant captures in one game is three. This record is shared by three games; in none of them were all three captures by the same player. The earliest known example is a 1980 game between Alexandru Segal and Karl-Heinz Podzielny.

History
In old versions of chess, the pawn could not advance two squares on its first move. The two-square advance was introduced later, between the 13th and 16th centuries, to speed up games. The en passant capture may have been introduced at that time, or may have come later; the earliest references to this rule date to the 16th century.

The en passant capture was one of the last major additions to European chess. In some parts of Europe, particularly in Italy, the rule was excluded; this exclusion was known as passar battaglia. In 1880, Italy adopted the rules used by the rest of the world, including the en passant capture, in preparation for the 1881 Milan tournament.

Draw by repetition and stalemate
In the context of threefold and fivefold repetition, two positions are considered different if the opportunity to perform a given en passant capture exists in one position but not the other.

When a player is not in check, and capturing en passant is their only legal move, they are forbidden to "claim" a draw by stalemate; they must either perform the move or end the game on their turn via normal means. In his book on chess organization and rules, International Arbiter Kenneth Harkness wrote that people frequently asked if this is the case. Chess players debated this point in the 19th century, with some arguing that the right to capture en passant is a "privilege" that one cannot be compelled to exercise. In his 1860 book Chess Praxis, Howard Staunton wrote that the en passant capture is mandatory in such a position; the rules of chess were amended to make this clear.

Chess problems
The en passant capture is often used as a theme in chess problems. According to Kenneth S. Howard, "En passant pawn captures frequently produce striking effects in the opening and closing of lines, both for white and black." By retrograde analysis convention, a pawn may be captured en passant only if it can be proven to have advanced two squares on the previous move.

In the diagrammed 1938 composition by Howard, the  
1. d4 
introduces the threat of 2.d5+ cxd5 3.Bxd5#. Black can capture the d4-pawn en passant in either of two ways:
1... exd3 e.p. 
shifting the e4-pawn from the e- to the d-file, preventing an en passant capture after White plays 2.f4.

Or Black can play
1... cxd3 e.p.
and now White exploits the newly opened a2–g8 diagonal with 2.Qa2+ d5 3.cxd6 e.p.#.

The diagrammed 1902 composition by Sommerfeldt shows the effect of pins on en passant captures.

The key 
1. d4! 
threatens 2.Qf2#. The moves of the black e-pawn are restricted in an unusual manner. The en passant capture 1...exd3 e.p.+ is illegal (it exposes Black’s king to check), but 
1... e3+ 
is legal. This, however, removes the black king's access to e3, allowing 
2. d5#

Chess variants
In most chess variants, pawns move as in standard chess, so the en passant capture is the same. Some larger variants allow pawns to make an initial move of more than two squares. For example, a pawn can make an initial move of up to four squares in double chess, and up to six squares in chess on a really big board. Such games usually allow an en passant capture on any square the pawn passes.

In some three-dimensional variants, such as millennium 3D chess or Alice chess, capturing en passant is allowed, though in the former case, the captured pawn's two-square move cannot have been purely vertical. In 5D Chess with Multiverse Time Travel, capturing en passant is allowed within the spatial dimensions but not across time or between timelines.

Some fairy chess pieces can capture en passant, such as the Berolina pawn.

The en passant capture is not present in some chess variants, such as Dragonchess and Raumschach. Traditional Asian games of the chess family such as shogi, xiangqi, and janggi have no two-square pawn advance and therefore no en passant capture.

Notes

References

Bibliography

External links
 En passant (Chess) by Edward Winter
 En passant Lichess lesson

Rules of chess
Chess terminology
15th century in chess

pl:Pion (szachy)#Bicie w przelocie